Amulree may refer to:

Places
 Amulree, village in Scotland
 Amulree, Ontario, Canada

People
 William Mackenzie, 1st Baron Amulree, a British politician
 Basil William Sholto Mackenzie, 2nd Baron Amulree, a leading advocate of geriatric medicine in the UK

Other uses
 Baron Amulree, a title in the Peerage of the UK